Mata (Matı) is a rural locality (a village) in Novoberdyashsky Selsoviet, Karaidelsky District, Bashkortostan, Russia. The population was 30 as of 2010. There is 1 street.

Geography 
Mata is located 64 km southeast of Karaidel (the district's administrative centre) by road. Shamratovo is the nearest rural locality.

References 

Rural localities in Karaidelsky District